Francis Murphy (born 1 June 1959) is a Scottish former professional footballer who played in the Football League as a midfielder.

External links
Profile at ENFA
Hendon Profile at Greensnet

1959 births
Living people
Footballers from Glasgow
Scottish footballers
Association football midfielders
Desborough Town F.C. players
Kettering Town F.C. players
Nuneaton Borough F.C. players
Barnet F.C. players
Slough Town F.C. players
Corby Town F.C. players
Cray Wanderers F.C. players
Dulwich Hamlet F.C. players
Hendon F.C. players
English Football League players